The Syracuse Rapid Transit Railway, an interurban railroad, was chartered on May 21, 1896. The company was a consolidation of the Syracuse Street Railroad Company, the Syracuse Consolidated Street Railway Company and the People's Railroad Company which was formerly leased to the Syracuse Street Railroad Company.

The company was consolidated with the New York State Railways, affiliated with New York Central Railroad in 1912.

New York State Railways (1912-1939)
Syracuse Rapid Transit Railway was consolidated with the New York State Railways, affiliated with New York Central Railroad in 1912. The former Syracuse Rapid Transit went on to form the majority of what would become the Syracuse Lines of New York State Railways. The parent company entered receivership in 1929, from which it emerged in 1934. The Syracuse Lines were reorganized as the Syracuse Transit Corporation on November 22, 1939. The last day of streetcar operation in Syracuse was January 4, 1941.

References

Defunct railroads in Syracuse, New York
Defunct New York (state) railroads
Railway companies established in 1896
Railway companies disestablished in 1912
Interurban railways in New York (state)
American companies disestablished in 1912
American companies established in 1896
1912 disestablishments in New York (state)
1896 establishments in New York (state)